Zachary L'Heureux is a Canadian junior ice hockey forward who plays for the Halifax Mooseheads of the Quebec Major Junior Hockey League (QMJHL) as a prospect to the Nashville Predators of the National Hockey League (NHL). He was drafted by the Predators in the first round of the 2021 NHL Entry Draft with the 27th overall pick in the draft.  According to L'Heureux, he models his playing style after agitators such as Brad Marchand and Matthew Tkachuk. On July 28, 2021, L'Heureux was signed to a three-year, entry-level contract with the Predators.

Career statistics

Regular season and playoffs

International

References

External links
 

2003 births
Living people
Canadian ice hockey forwards
Halifax Mooseheads players
Moncton Wildcats players
Nashville Predators draft picks
National Hockey League first-round draft picks
Ice hockey people from Montreal